Andréas Grahm (born 1 September 1987) is a Swedish footballer who plays for Nosaby IF as a forward.

References

External links

1987 births
Living people
Association football forwards
Trelleborgs FF players
Allsvenskan players
Superettan players
Swedish footballers